Johan Cappelen (25 February 1889 – 18 October 1947) was a Norwegian lawyer and politician for the Conservative Party.

He was born in Skogn as a son of physician Johan Christian Severin Cappelen (1855–1936) and Katharina M. Steen (1859–1915). He had one sister and one brother. He was a nephew of physician Axel Hermansen Cappelen.

He graduated from the Royal Frederick University with cand.jur. degree in 1911. He worked as a deputy judge, and from 1915, attorney in Trondhjem. He was barrister  with access to work with Supreme Court from 1922.

As a politician Cappelen was elected to Trondhjem city council, serving as mayor from 1931 to 1934. In 1940 he was appointed County Governor of Sør-Trøndelag. However, due to the German occupation of Norway Cappelen was removed in the autumn of 1940.

In 1942 he joined the "Five Man Committee" in Trøndelag which was going to build the resistance group Sivorg. He was a close contact of Ferdinand Schjelderup in Kretsen. In 1943 he was denounced by Henry Rinnan when the Thingstad Group was discovered. He was arrested in March 1943 and imprisoned in Vollan and Falstad. After falling ill he was transferred to Innherred Hospital, where he managed to continue his resistance work with contacts to Trondheim. However, in March 1945 he was transferred to Grini concentration camp and remained there until the war's end.

When the occupation ended in 1945, Cappelen was appointed Minister of Justice and the Police in the non-partisan coalition government Gerhardsen's First Cabinet. This cabinet lasted from June to November 1945, when a general election was held and the Gerhardsen's Second Cabinet assumed office. Cappelen was then reinstated as County Governor of Sør-Trøndelag, a post he held until his death in 1947.

References

1889 births
1947 deaths
People from Levanger
University of Oslo alumni
20th-century Norwegian lawyers
Mayors of Trondheim
Conservative Party (Norway) politicians
County governors of Norway
Government ministers of Norway
Norwegian resistance members
Grini concentration camp survivors
Falstad concentration camp survivors
Vollan concentration camp survivors
Johan
Ministers of Justice of Norway